George Enescu (– 4 May 1955), known in France as Georges Enesco, was a Romanian composer, violinist, conductor and teacher and is regarded as one of the greatest musicians in Romanian history.

Biography

Enescu was born in Romania, in the village of Liveni (later renamed "George Enescu" in his honor), then in Dorohoi County, today Botoșani County. His father was Costache Enescu, a landholder, and his mother was Maria Enescu (née Cosmovici), the daughter of an Orthodox priest. Their eighth child, he was born after all the previous siblings had died in infancy.  His father later separated from Maria Enescu and had another son with Maria Ferdinand-Suschi: the painter Dumitru Bâșcu.

A child prodigy, Enescu began experimenting with composing at an early age. Several, mostly very short, pieces survive, all for violin and piano. The earliest work of significant length bears the title Pămînt românesc ("Romanian Land"), and is inscribed "opus for piano and violin by George Enescu, Romanian composer, aged five years and a quarter". Shortly thereafter, his father presented him to the professor and composer Eduard Caudella. On 5 October 1888, at the age of seven, he became the youngest student ever admitted to the Vienna Conservatory, where he studied with Joseph Hellmesberger Jr., Robert Fuchs, and Sigismund Bachrich. He was the second person ever to be admitted to the Vienna Conservatory by a dispensation of age, and was the first non-Austrian (in 1882, Fritz Kreisler had also been admitted at the age of seven; according to the rules, nobody younger than 14 years could study there).

In 1891, the ten-year-old Enescu gave a private concert at the Court of Vienna, in the presence of Emperor Franz Joseph.

Joseph Hellmesberger Sr., one of his teachers and the director of the Vienna Conservatory, hosted Enescu at his home, where the child prodigy met his idol, Johannes Brahms.

He graduated at the age of 12, earning the silver medal. In his Viennese concerts young Enescu played works by Brahms, Sarasate and Mendelssohn. In 1895, he went to Paris to continue his studies. He studied violin with Martin Pierre Marsick, harmony with André Gedalge, and composition with Jules Massenet and Gabriel Fauré.

Enescu then studied from 1895 to 1899 at the Conservatoire de Paris. André Gedalge said that he was "the only one [among his students] who truly had ideas and spirit".

On 6 February 1898, at the age of 16, Enescu presented in Paris his first mature work, Poema Română, played by the Colonne Orchestra, then one of the most prestigious in the world, and conducted by Édouard Colonne.

Many of Enescu's works were influenced by Romanian folk music, his most popular compositions being the two Romanian Rhapsodies (1901–02), the opera Œdipe (1936), and the suites for orchestra. He also wrote five mature symphonies (two of them unfinished), a symphonic poem Vox maris, and much chamber music (three sonatas for violin and piano, two for cello and piano, a piano trio, two string quartets and two piano quartets, a wind decet (French, "dixtuor"), an octet for strings, a piano quintet, and a chamber symphony for twelve solo instruments). A young Ravi Shankar recalled in the 1960s how Enescu, who had developed a deep interest in Oriental music, rehearsed with Shankar's brother Uday Shankar and his musicians. Around the same time, Enescu took the young Yehudi Menuhin to the Colonial Exhibition in Paris, where he introduced him to the Gamelan Orchestra from Indonesia.

On 8 January 1923 he made his American debut as a conductor in a concert given by the Philadelphia Orchestra at Carnegie Hall in New York City, and subsequently visited the United States many times. It was in America, in the 1920s, that Enescu was first persuaded to make recordings as a violinist. He also appeared as a conductor with many American orchestras and, in 1936, was one of the candidates considered to replace Arturo Toscanini as permanent conductor of the New York Philharmonic. In 1932, Enescu was elected a titular member of the Romanian Academy. In 1935, he conducted the Orchestre Symphonique de Paris and Yehudi Menuhin (who had been his pupil for several years starting in 1927) in Mozart's Violin Concerto No. 3 in G major. He also conducted the New York Philharmonic between 1937 and 1938. In 1939, he married Maria Tescanu Rosetti (known as Princess Maruca Cantacuzino through her first husband Mihail Cantacuzino), a good friend of Queen Marie of Romania. 

He was also renowned as a violin teacher. He began teaching at the Mannes School of Music in 1948. His students included Yehudi Menuhin, Christian Ferras, Ivry Gitlis, Arthur Grumiaux, Serge Blanc, Ida Haendel, Uto Ughi, and Joan Field. 

He promoted contemporary Romanian music, playing works of Constantin Silvestri, Mihail Jora, Jonel Perlea and Marţian Negrea. Enescu considered Bach's Sonatas and Partitas for solo violin as the "Himalayas of violinists". An annotated version of this work brings together the indications of Enescu regarding sonority, phrasing, tempos, musicality, fingering and expression.

Enescu died on 4 May 1955. On his death, he was interred in Père Lachaise Cemetery in Paris.

Reception

Pablo Casals described Enescu as "the greatest musical phenomenon since Mozart" and "one of the greatest geniuses of modern music". Queen Marie of Romania wrote in her memoirs that "in George Enescu was real gold". Yehudi Menuhin, Enescu's most famous pupil, once said about his teacher: "He will remain for me the absoluteness through which I judge others", and "Enescu gave me the light that has guided my entire existence." He also considered Enescu "the most extraordinary human being, the greatest musician and the most formative influence" he had ever experienced. Vincent d'Indy claimed that if Beethoven's works were destroyed, they could be all reconstructed from memory by George Enescu. Alfred Cortot, one of the greatest pianists of all time, once said that Enescu, though primarily a violinist, had better piano technique than his own.

Enescu's only opera, Œdipe (Oedipe), was staged for the first time at the Royal Opera House in London in 2016, 80 years after its Paris premiere, in a production directed and designed by La Fura dels Baus which received superlative reviews in The Guardian, The Independent, The Times and other publications.  An analysis of Enescu's work and the reasons why it is less known in the UK was published by musician Dominic Saunders in The Guardian.

Commemorations
Eugène Ysaÿe's Violin Sonata No. 3 in D minor, subtitled "Ballade" (composed in 1923), was dedicated as an act of homage to fellow-violinist Enescu. 

While staying in Bucharest during the 1930s, Enescu lived in the Cantacuzino Palace on Calea Victoriei and married its then owner, Maruca Cantacuzino, in 1939. After the Communist takeover, the couple occupied a part of it briefly before moving to Paris in 1947. Following Enescu's death in 1955, Maruca donated the palace to the Romanian state in order to organize a museum in memory of the great musician. Likewise, the Symphony Orchestra of Bucharest and the George Enescu Festival—founded by his friend, musical advocate, and sometime collaborator, the conductor George Georgescu—are named and held in his honor, and the composer's childhood home in Liveni was inaugurated as a memorial museum in 1958.

Earlier still, in 1947, his wife Maruca donated to the state the mansion near Moinești where Enescu had lived and where he completed his opera Oedip, provided that a cultural centre be built there. In Moinești itself there is a street named after the composer, as well as a middle school. In addition the renamed George Enescu International Airport at Bacău is some twenty miles away. Then in 2014  the home of Enescu's maternal grandfather in Mihăileni, Botoșani, where the composer spent part of his childhood, was rescued from an advanced state of dilapidation by a team of volunteer architects and now houses a centre of excellence for the study of music.

Enescu's portrait appeared on the redesigned 5 lei Romanian banknote in 2005.

Selected works

Operas
 Œdipe, tragédie lyrique in four acts, libretto by Edmond Fleg, Op. 23 (1910–31)

Symphonies
 Symphony No. 1 in E major, Op. 13 (1905)
 Symphony No. 2 in A major, Op. 17 (1912–14)
 Symphony No. 3 in C major, with chorus, Op. 21 (1916–18)
Symphony No. 4 in E minor (1935; completed by Pascal Bentoiu in 1996)
Symphony No. 5 in D major, with women's chorus and tenor solo (1941; completed by Pascal Bentoiu in 1995)

Other orchestral works
 Poème roumain, symphonic suite for orchestra, Op. 1 (1897)
 Romanian Rhapsody No. 1 in A major, Op. 11 (1901)
 Romanian Rhapsody No. 2 in D major, Op. 11 (1901)
 Symphonia concertante in B minor, Op. 8 (1901)
 Orchestral Suite No. 1 in C major, Op. 9 (1903)
 Orchestral Suite No. 2 in C major, Op. 20 (1915)
 Orchestral Suite No. 3 in D major Suite Villageoise, Op. 27 (1937–38)
 Overture on Popular Romanian Themes, Op. 32

Chamber works

String quartets
 String Quartet No. 1 in E major, Op. 22, No. 1 (1916–20)
 String Quartet No. 2 in G major, Op. 22, No. 2 (1930–32)

Sonatas
 Violin Sonata No. 1 in D major, Op. 2 (1897)
 Violin Sonata No. 2 in F minor, Op. 6 (1899)
 Violin Sonata No. 3 in A minor dans le caractère populaire roumain, Op. 25 (1926)
 Cello Sonata No. 1 in F minor, Op. 26, No. 1 (1898)
 Cello Sonata No. 2 in C major, Op. 26, No. 2 (1935)

Other chamber works

 Octet for Strings in C major, Op. 7 (1900)
 Cantabile et Presto, for flute and piano (1904)
 Decet in D major, for wind instruments, Op. 14 (1906)
 Concertstück, for viola and piano (1906)
 Légende, for trumpet and piano (1906)
 Piano Quartet No. 1 in D major, Op. 16 (1909)
 Impressions d'enfance in D major, for violin and piano, Op. 28 (1940)
 Piano Quintet in A minor, Op. 29 (1940)
 Piano Quartet No. 2 in D minor, Op. 30 (1943–44)
 Chamber Symphony, for 12 instruments, Op. 33 (1954)

Piano music
 Piano Suite No. 1 in G minor, Dans le style ancien  Op. 3 (1897)
 Piano Suite No. 2 in D major, Op. 10 (1901/1903)
 Piano Suite No. 3, Pieces impromptues Op. 18 (1913–16)
 Piano Sonata No. 1 in F minor, op 24, No. 1 (1924)
 Piano Sonata No. 3 in D major, op 24, No. 3 (1933–35)
 Piano Arrangement of Romanian Rhapsody No. 1 in A major, Op. 11 (1951)

Songs
Three songs setting Lemaitre and Prudhomme
Four songs setting Fernand Gregh
In German:
Various settings of Carmen Silva (Queen Elisabeth of Romania)
In Romanian – 3 songs
 Trois Mélodies, Op. 4 (1898)
 Sept Chansons de Clement Marot, for tenor and piano, Op. 15 (1907–08)
 Trois Mélodies, Op. 19 (1916)

See also
 :Category:Compositions by George Enescu
 George Enescu Philharmonic Orchestra
 George Enescu International Competition
 List of 20th century classical composers

References

Sources
 Axente, Colette, and Ileana Ratiu. 1998. George Enescu: Biografie documentara, tineretea si afirmarea: 1901–1920. Bucharest: Editura muzicala a U.C.M.R.
 Bentoiu, Pascal. 2010. Masterworks of George Enescu: A Detailed Analysis, translated by Lory Wallfisch. Lanham, MD: Scarecrow Press.  (cloth)  (ebook). Translation of Capodopere enesciene. Bucharest: Editura muzicala a U.C.M.R., 1984.
 Brediceanu, M. et al. 1997. Celebrating George Enescu: A Symposium. Washington, D.C.:.
 Gheorghiu, V. 1944. Un Muzician Genial: George Enescu.
 Cophignon, Alain. 2006. Georges Enesco. Paris: Librairie Arthème Fayard. . Romanian version as George Enescu, translated by Domnica Ilea, Bucharest: Editura Institutului Cultural Român, 2009, .
 Cosma, Viorel. 2000. George Enescu: A Tragic Life in Pictures. Bucharest: The Romanian Cultural Foundation Publishing House.
 Malcolm, Noel. 1990. George Enescu: His Life and Music, with a preface by Sir Yehudi Menuhin. London: Toccata Press.  (cloth);  (pbk)
 Malcolm, Noel. 2001. "Enescu, George." The New Grove Dictionary of Music and Musicians, second edition, edited by Stanley Sadie and John Tyrrell. London: Macmillan Publishers.
 
 Roth, Henry (1997). Violin Virtuosos: From Paganini to the 21st Century. Los Angeles, CA: California Classics Books. 
 Slonimsky, Nicolas (ed.). 2001. "Georges Enesco." Baker's Biographical Dictionary of Musicians. Centennial Edition. New York: Schirmer Books.
 Voicana, Mircea. 1971. “Anii de formare: Copilǎria (1881–1888); Studiila la Viena (1888–1894)”. In George Enescu: Monografie. 2 vols, edited by Mircea Voicana, 1: 7–129 (part 1, chapters 1–2). Bucharest: Editura Academiei Republicii Socialiste România.
 Voicana, Mircea (ed.) 1976. Enesciana, I. . (in Fr., Ger., and Eng.)

External links

 
  Legendary Violinists
 International Enescu Society
 Georges Enesco's Profile at The Remington Site: his Continental Bach Recordings and Remington Recordings plus a survey of Sonatas & Partitas in the 1950s
 International Festival and Competition "George Enescu"
 
 
 A page on the closely linked lives of Enescu and Chailley
 Another site, with a helpful timeline
 Pascal Bentoiu: George Enescu, the composer
 Reissue of the complete Bach clavier concertos conducted by Enesco on 4 CDs
 Review on Musicweb-International by Evan Dickerson of available recordings featuring Enescu's compositions (updated May 2005)
 Review on Musicweb-International by Evan Dickerson of Enescu's recordings as a performer (violinist, conductor & pianist)(updated July 2005)
 Romanian Rhapsody No.1
 Georges Enescu Octet in C, Op.7 sound-bites and short bio

1881 births
1955 deaths
People from Botoșani County
Members of the Chamber of Deputies (Romania)
20th-century classical composers
Romanian opera composers
Romanian classical composers
Romanian classical violinists
Male classical violinists
Romanian classical pianists
Male classical composers
Male classical pianists
20th-century classical pianists
20th-century classical violinists
Male conductors (music)
Romanian conductors (music)
20th-century male musicians
University of Music and Performing Arts Vienna alumni
Conservatoire de Paris alumni
Academic staff of the École Normale de Musique de Paris
Titular members of the Romanian Academy
Chevaliers of the Légion d'honneur
Burials at Père Lachaise Cemetery